Mount Goyazan is a mountain in the northwestern Qazakh District of Azerbaijan. It is located in the vicinity of the villages Abbasbeyli and Alpout, and rises 4857.9 metres above sea level. Ruins of a Goyazan fortress from the 14th century were found near the mountain.

References

See also
Qazakh Rayon
Tourism in Azerbaijan

Goyazan